Goodbye Uncle Tom is a 1971 Italian Mondo docudrama co-directed and co-written by Gualtiero Jacopetti and Franco Prosperi with music by Riz Ortolani. The film is based on true events in which the filmmakers explore antebellum America, using period documents to examine in graphic detail the racist ideology and degrading conditions faced by Africans under slavery.  Because of the use of published documents and materials from the public record, the film labels itself a documentary, though all footage is re-staged using actors.

Production 
The film was shot primarily in Haiti, where directors Jacopetti and Prosperi were treated as guests of Haitian dictator Papa Doc Duvalier. Duvalier supported the filmmakers by giving them diplomatic cars, clearance to film anywhere on the island, as many extras as they required, and even a weekly dinner with Duvalier himself. Hundreds of Haitian extras participated in the film's various depictions of the cruel treatment of slaves, as well as white actors portraying historical characters (including Harriet Beecher Stowe).

Scenes were also shot in the U.S. states of Mississippi, Louisiana and Florida.

Release 
The film was confiscated in Italy and re-released the following year, 1972, in a cut version bearing the different title Zio Tom.

In France, the film was released as Les Négriers, in Germany as Addio, Onkel Tom!

Alternative versions

The directors' cut of Addio Zio Tom draws parallels between the horrors of slavery and the rise of the Black Power Movement, represented by Eldridge Cleaver, LeRoi Jones, Stokely Carmichael, and a few others.  The film ends with an unidentified man’s fantasy re-enactment of William Styron's The Confessions of Nat Turner. This man imagines Nat Turner's revolt in the present, including the brutal murder of the whites around him, who replace the figures Turner talks about in Styron's novel as the unidentified reader speculates about Turner's motivations and ultimate efficacy in changing the conditions he rebelled against.  American distributors felt that such scenes were too incendiary, and forced Jacopetti and Prosperi to remove more than thirteen minutes of footage explicitly concerned with racial politics for American and other Anglophone audiences.

Reception 
The film has frequently been criticized as racist, despite directors Jacopetti and Prosperi's claims to the contrary. In Roger Ebert's 1972 review of the shorter American version, he asserts that the directors have "Made the most disgusting, contemptuous insult to decency ever to masquerade as a documentary." He goes on to call the film "cruel exploitation", believing that the directors degraded the poor Haitian extras playing slaves by having them enact the extremely dehumanizing situations the film depicts virtually as they occurred. Gene Siskel put the film second (behind The Last House on the Left) on his year-end list of what he called the sickest films he saw in 1972. Critic Pauline Kael called the film "the most specific and rabid incitement to race war".

The directors denied charges of racism; in the 2003 documentary Godfathers of Mondo they specifically note that one of their intentions in making Addio Zio Tom was to "make a new film that would be clearly anti-racist" in response to criticism by Ebert and others over perceived racism in their previous film Africa Addio.

The film was a commercial failure.  Currently, it is considered a cult classic.

Italian film critic Marco Giusti calls it "not bad" and remembers that the numerous scenes in the nude "made a certain effect back then".

Soundtrack 
The film was scored by Italian composer Riz Ortolani and is notable for the theme "Oh My Love" sung by Katyna Ranieri, which would later be used in the soundtrack to the film Drive (2011). Ortolani also collaborated with directors Jacopetti and Prosperi on their previous films, Mondo Cane, and Africa Addio.

See also
List of films featuring slavery

References

Bibliography

External links 
 
 Online Trailer (English version)

1971 films
1970s exploitation films
Italian drama films
1970s Italian-language films
Films about American slavery
Films about race and ethnicity
Mondo films
Documentary films about slavery in the United States
Films directed by Gualtiero Jacopetti
Films shot in Haiti
Films scored by Riz Ortolani
Golan-Globus films
1970s Italian films